The Order of Mathilde (Mathildeordenen) was a Danish royal order, created by the queen of Denmark, Caroline Matilda of Great Britain, after whom it was named, on the birthday of the king, Christian VII of Denmark, 29 January 1771. It was no longer used after the banishment of its founder the year after.

The order was used to award members of the royal house, and a close circle around the royal couple and followers of the queen and her lover Johann Friedrich Struensee. Eleven of the twelve recipients were decorated on the birthday celebration of the monarch the same day the order was created. The exception was Louise von Plessen, who was awarded it in her absence, being in exile at Celle.

Recipients

 Caroline Matilda of Great Britain
 Christian VII of Denmark
 Juliana Maria of Brunswick-Wolfenbüttel
 Frederick, Hereditary Prince of Denmark
 Johann Friedrich Struensee
 Peter Elias von Gähler 
 Christine Sophie von Gähler 
 Schack Carl Rantzau-Ascheberg
 Caroline Schimmelmann
 Amalie Sophie Holstein
 Enevold Brandt
 Louise von Plessen

References 

 Lars Stevnsborg: Kongeriget Danmarks ordener, medaljer og hederstegn. Kongeriget Islands ordener og medaljer, Syddansk Universitetsforlag, 2005, s. 191–194

Dynastic orders
1771 in Denmark
Awards established in 1771
Caroline Matilda of Great Britain